Alan Gabriel Rodríguez (born 1 May 1993) is an Argentine footballer who last played for Italian club Avezzano Calcio as a central defender or a left back.

Club career
Born in San Isidro, Buenos Aires, Rodríguez played youth football for three clubs including All Boys and Huracán, never appeared in a senior match for both clubs. In June 2014 he joined Club Atlético Fénix in the Primera B Metropolitana, but only made his professional debut on 17 February of the following year by starting in a 1–2 home loss against Club Atlético Brown.

In January 2016 Rodríguez moved to CSyD Flandria, but left the club the following month to join CF Reus Deportiu. Initially assigned to the farm team CD Morell, he failed to make a senior appearance for both sides.

On 14 July 2016, Rodríguez signed for Segunda División B side CF Gavà.

References

External links

1993 births
Living people
People from San Isidro, Buenos Aires
Argentine footballers
Association football defenders
Primera B Metropolitana players
Club Atlético Fénix players
Segunda División B players
CF Gavà players
Sportspeople from Buenos Aires Province